George Dixon (July 29, 1870 – January 6, 1908) was a Canadian professional boxer. After winning the bantamweight title in 1892, he became the first ever black athlete to win a world championship in any sport; he was also the first Canadian-born boxing champion. Ring Magazine founder Nat Fleischer ranked Dixon as the #1 featherweight of all-time. He was inducted into Canada's Sports Hall of Fame in 1955, the Ring Magazine Hall of Fame in 1956 and the International Boxing Hall of Fame as a first-class inductee in 1990. In 2018 he was named one of the greatest 15 athletes in Nova Scotia's history, ranking sixth.

Boxing career 
Dixon was born in Africville, Halifax, Nova Scotia. Dixon is widely credited for developing shadowboxing.

Dixon claimed the world bantamweight title on May 10, 1888, after a bout with Tommy Spider Kelly, and was officially considered the champion after knocking out Nunc Wallace of England in 18 rounds two years later on June 27, 1890. 

The following year, on May 31, 1891, Dixon beat Cal McCarthy in 22 rounds to win the world featherweight title. While he held the title, Dixon established a vaudeville troupe he called the "George Dixon Specialty Co." which toured Canada and the United States; it appeared at the Naylor Opera House in Terre Haute, Indiana, on November 8, 1894. 

On October 4, 1897, he lost the title by decision in a rematch bout with Solly Smith, who he had previously defeated by seventh-round technical knockout.

In a close bout, he lost to the British featherweight champion Ben Jordan on July 1, 1898, at New York's Lenox Club in a classic twenty five round points decision by referee Charley White.  According to the San Francisco Chronicle, "Dixon did the leading but unlike many of those who had previously met the little Colored fighter, Jordan went at him and mixed it all the time." The bout was close, and many believed a draw would have been a better decision. Jordan was down on his hands and knees in the seventh from a blow by Dixon, but the bout contained relatively few knockdowns and no counts.  The bout ended with a flurry by Dixon, but the referee did not feel it adequate to award him the decision.  The Chronicle actually believed Dixon had the edge in the fighting. The Los Angeles Times also agreed the bout was close and that "Both men fought well and there was little to choose between them".

Dixon was in talks to face champion Solly Smith in a third meeting, however, Smith lost the world title in a surprising upset against Dave Sullivan – the bout was stopped in the fifth round after Smith sustained a broken arm. Dixon instead turned his attention to newly crowned champion Sullivan, and on November 11, 1898, he reclaimed the world featherweight title by decisively defeating him in a tenth round disqualification at New York City's Lenox Club.  Sullivan had held the title only forty-six days. 

 
At the time of the fight the betting favored Dixon, but was close, and briefly went to even odds. For nine rounds in front of eight thousand spectators, Dixon had the advantage.  
In the final round, Sullivan's brother Jack walked into the ring twice to speak to Jimmy Coville the referee about the time remaining in the round, eventually causing Coville to end the fight, in frustration over Jack's infraction.  Sullivan could have fought on, though he would have almost certainly lost the fight.

Dixon lost his featherweight title in a 15-round decision to Abe Attell on October 28, 1901, though other sources credit his loss of the title to Terry McGovern on January 9, 1900.

By that time, he had moved to Boston, where he had family; it was a destination for other immigrants from Africville. 

Not long after his last fight, Dixon died on January 6, 1908, in the alcohol ward of Bellevue Hospital. Dixon was living and begging on the streets of New York with no friends. Attempts by Dixon's fans to get Dixon back on his feet failed and the media reported the end was near for the former champion who had fallen on dark times. Dixon would tell doctors he had no friends except for former world heavyweight champion John L. Sullivan.
Part of his hospital bills for the illness that took his life was paid for by a charity boxing tournament put on January 23, 1908, at Bower's Minery Theatre in New York. He is interred in the Mount Hope Cemetery in Boston, Massachusetts. A recreation and community centre adjacent Uniacke Square in Halifax is named in his honour. In 2021, Dixon was named a National Historic Person by the government of Canada, on the recommendation of the national Historic Sites and Monuments Board.

Professional boxing record
All information in this section is derived from BoxRec, unless otherwise stated.

Official record

All newspaper decisions are officially regarded as “no decision” bouts and are not counted as a win, loss or draw.

Unofficial record

Record with the inclusion of newspaper decisions to the win/loss/draw column.

References

Further reading
Laffoley, Steven (2012). Shadowboxing: The Rise and Fall of George Dixon. Pottersfield Press.

External links 

Africville - The Spirit Lives On - History Captured''
Biography at the Dictionary of Canadian Biography Online
 

George Dixon - CBZ Profile

|-

  

|-
|-

  

|-

  

1870 births
1908 deaths
Black Canadian boxers
World featherweight boxing champions
World bantamweight boxing champions
Sportspeople from Halifax, Nova Scotia
Black Nova Scotians
Bantamweight boxers
Featherweight boxers
Canadian expatriate sportspeople in the United States
Canadian male boxers